Partial general elections were held in Luxembourg on 3 June 1951, electing 26 of the 52 seats in the Chamber of Deputies in the south and east of the country. The Christian Social People's Party won 12 of the 26 seats, but saw its total number of seats fall from 22 to 21.

Results

References

Chamber of Deputies (Luxembourg) elections
Legislative election, 1951
Luxembourg
1951 in Luxembourg
June 1951 events in Europe